Anta Q'asa (Quechua anta copper, q'asa mountain pass, "copper mountain pass", Hispanicized spelling Antaccasa, Antajasa) is a mountain in the Andes of Peru, about  high. It is situated in the Junín Region, Yauli Province, Marcapomacocha District, and in the Lima Region, Huarochirí Province, Chicla District. Anta Q'asa lies southwest of the mountain Pukaqucha, west of the mountains Yuraqqucha and Sillaqaqa, northeast of  Llawa P'ukru and east of the mountain Quriqucha.

References

Mountains of Peru
Mountains of Lima Region
Mountains of Junín Region